The Municipality of Velika Polana is a municipality in the traditional region of Prekmurje in northeastern Slovenia. The seat of the municipality is the town of Velika Polana. Velika Polana became a municipality in 1998.

Settlements
In addition to the municipal seat of Velika Polana, the municipality also includes the settlements of Brezovica and Mala Polana.

References

External links

Municipality of Velika Polana on Geopedia
Municipality of Velika Polana website

Velika Polana
1998 establishments in Slovenia